The Boylston Professorship of Rhetoric and Oratory is an endowed chair at Harvard University. It was established in 1804, and endowed by the will of a Boston merchant, Nicholas Boylston.

References 

Professorships at Harvard University